Daniel Stewart Butterfield (born Dharma Jeremy Butterfield; March 21, 1973) is a Canadian billionaire businessman, best known for co-founding the photo-sharing website Flickr and the team-messaging application Slack.

Early life and education
In 1973, Butterfield was born in Lund, British Columbia, to Norma and David Butterfield. For the first five years of his life he grew up in a log cabin without running water or electricity. His family lived on a commune in remote Canada after his father fled the US to avoid being drafted for the Vietnam War. His family moved to Victoria when Butterfield was five years old. As a child, Butterfield taught himself how to code, and changed his name to Stewart when he was 12.

Butterfield was educated at St. Michaels University School in Victoria, British Columbia and made money in university designing websites. He received a B.A. degree in philosophy from the University of Victoria in 1996 and went on to earn a Master of Philosophy from Clare College, Cambridge in 1998.

Career

In 2000, Butterfield worked with Jason Classon to build a startup called Gradfinder.com. Following Gradfinder.com's acquisition, he worked as a freelance web designer. Butterfield also created a contest called the 5K competition, centered on people with the ability to design websites under 5 kilobytes.

Ludicorp and Flickr
In the summer of 2002, he co-founded Ludicorp with Caterina Fake and Jason Classon in Vancouver. Ludicorp initially developed a massively multiplayer online role-playing game called Game Neverending. After the game failed to launch, the company started a photo-sharing website called Flickr. In March 2005, Ludicorp was acquired by Yahoo!, where Butterfield continued as the General Manager of Flickr until he left Yahoo! on July 12, 2008.

Tiny Speck
In 2009, Butterfield co-founded a new company called Tiny Speck. Tiny Speck launched its first project, the massively multiplayer game Glitch, on September 27, 2011. Glitch was later closed due to its failure to attract a sufficiently large audience. The game world closed down on December 9, 2012, but the website remained online. In January 2013, the company announced that it would make the most of the game's art available under a Creative Commons license. On December 9, 2014, a fan project to relaunch Glitch under the name Eleven began alpha testing.

Slack

In August 2013, Butterfield announced the release of Slack, an instant-message-based team communication tool, built by Tiny Speck while working on Glitch. After its public release in February 2014, the tool grew at a weekly rate of 5 to 10 percent, with more than 120,000 daily users registered in the first week of August. In early 2014, the data for Slack's first six-month usage period showed that nearly 16,000 users were registered without any advertising.

That same year, Butterfield secured an office for Slack employees in San Francisco, and was expected to commence recruitment during the second half of the year.

As of December 2015, Slack had raised US$340 million in venture capital and had more than 2 million daily active users, of which 570,000 were paid customers.

Slack was named Inc. Magazine’s 2015 company of the year.

In June 2019, the company announced its initial public offering with an opening price of $38.50 and a market capitalization of US$21.4 billion.

In December 2020, Salesforce confirmed plans to buy Slack for US$27.7 billion.

In December 2022, Butterfield announced his departure as CEO of Slack and leaving Salesforce early in January 2023.

Awards and honors
In 2005, Butterfield was named one of Businessweek'''s "Top 50" Leaders in the entrepreneur category. In the same year, he was also named in the TR35, a list collated by MIT in its MIT Technology Review publication, as one of the top 35 innovators in the world under the age of 35 years. In 2006, he was named in the "Time 100", Time magazine's list of the 100 most influential people in the world, and also appeared on the cover of Newsweek magazine.

In November 2008, Butterfield received the "Legacy Distinguished Alumni Award" from the University of Victoria.

In 2015, Stewart was named the Wall Street Journal's Technology Innovator for 2015, awarded TechCrunch’s Founder of the Year Crunchie, and included in Vanity Fair’s New Establishment, Advertising Age’s Creative 50, and Details’ Digital Mavericks lists.

In May 2017, he featured in Masters of Scale, a podcast series by Reid Hoffman, co-founder of Linkedin, along with other successful businesspeople such as Mark Zuckerberg, John Elkann, and Brian Chesky. In it, he discussed the scaling strategy adopted by Slack.

Personal life
Butterfield was married to Caterina Fake, his Flickr co-founder, from 2001 to 2007. They have one daughter together, who was born in 2007. In May 2019 he became engaged to Jennifer Rubio, co-founder of Away Luggage.

References

Further reading

 "Slack's Stewart Butterfield, in His Own Words" (April 2015), Inc magazine''
 Stewart Butterfield quotes on Theoriq (February 2017)
 

1973 births
Alumni of Clare College, Cambridge
Businesspeople from British Columbia
Canadian computer businesspeople
Canadian people of American descent
Living people
People from the qathet Regional District
University of Victoria alumni
Canadian billionaires